From the Bottom 2 the Top is the eighth and final studio album by American hip hop recording artist Coolio. It was released on July 2, 2009, by Subside Records. The following songs "Boyfriend", "Cruise Off", "Motivation" were taken from Coolio's previous album Steal Hear, which was released in 2008. It was the last album to be released during his lifetime.

Track listing

Personnel
Adapted from Allmusic.com.

Bassi Maestro	Producer
Big Fish	Producer
Calvin Broadus	Composer, Lyricist
Yves Cheminade	Composer
Nina Creese	Lyricist, Producer
Cyberpunkers	Additional Production, Remixing
Devon Davis	Composer, Producer
Yann Destagnol	Composer
Dj Nais	Producer
Sergio Fertitta	Composer, Producer
A. Ivey	Composer, Lyricist
Rob low        Producer
Yves Larock	Producer
Loose	Composer, Lyricist, Producer
Tiziano Lugli	Producer

 D. McDonald	Composer, Producer
J. Mondhera	Producer
Luca Moretti	Producer
Sam Obernick	Lyricist
Sam Obernik	Composer
N. Rodgers	Composer
Ricky Romanini	Producer
J. Rose	Composer, Lyricist
Stefan "Cheech" Roumel	Producer
J. Salinas	Composer, Lyricist
Michael Merrel Simmons	Producer
Romain Tranchart	Composer

References

2009 albums
Coolio albums